In mathematics, an indicator function or a characteristic function of a subset of a set is a function that maps elements of the subset to one, and all other elements to zero. That is, if  is a subset of some set , one has  if  and  otherwise, where  is a common notation for the indicator function.

For example, the Dirichlet function is the indicator function of the rational numbers as a subset of the real numbers.

Definition
The indicator function of a subset  of a set  is a function

defined as

Notation and terminology
The notation  is also used to denote the characteristic function in convex analysis, which is defined as if using the reciprocal of the standard definition of the indicator function.

A related concept in statistics is that of a dummy variable. (This must not be confused with "dummy variables" as that term is usually used in mathematics, also called a bound variable.)

The term "characteristic function" has an unrelated meaning in classic probability theory. For this reason, traditional probabilists use the term indicator function for the function defined here almost exclusively, while mathematicians in other fields are more likely to use the term characteristic function to describe the function that indicates membership in a set.

In fuzzy logic and modern many-valued logic, predicates are the characteristic functions of a probability distribution. That is, the strict true/false valuation of the predicate is replaced by a quantity interpreted as the degree of truth.

Basic properties

If  then  By a similar argument, if  then  

In the following, the dot represents multiplication,   etc. "+" and "−" represent addition and subtraction. "" and "" are intersection and union, respectively.

and the indicator function of the complement of  i.e.  is:

For any 

is clearly a product of s and s.  This product has the value 1 at precisely those  that belong to none of the sets  and is 0 otherwise. That is

Expanding the product on the left hand side,

This is one form of the principle of inclusion-exclusion.

As suggested by the previous example, the indicator function is a useful notational device in combinatorics.

This identity is used in a simple proof of Markov's inequality.

In many cases, such as order theory, the inverse of the indicator function may be defined. This is commonly called the generalized Möbius function, as a generalization of the inverse of the indicator function in elementary number theory, the Möbius function. (See paragraph below about the use of the inverse in classical recursion theory.)

Mean, variance and covariance
Given a probability space  with  the indicator random variable  is defined by  if  otherwise 

Mean    (also called "Fundamental Bridge").

Variance 

Covariance

Characteristic function in recursion theory, Gödel's and Kleene's representing function
Kurt Gödel described the representing function in his 1934 paper "On undecidable propositions of formal mathematical systems" (the "¬" indicates logical inversion, i.e. "NOT"): 

Kleene offers up the same definition in the context of the primitive recursive functions as a function  of a predicate  takes on values  if the predicate is true and  if the predicate is false.

For example, because the product of characteristic functions  whenever any one of the functions equals , it plays the role of logical OR: IF  OR  OR ... What appears to the modern reader as the representing function's logical inversion, i.e. the representing function is  when the function  is "true" or satisfied", plays a useful role in Kleene's definition of the logical functions OR, AND, and IMPLY, the bounded- and unbounded- mu operators and the CASE function.

Characteristic function in fuzzy set theory
In fuzzy set theory, characteristic functions are generalized to take value in the real unit interval , or more generally, in some algebra or structure (usually required to be at least a poset or lattice). Such generalized characteristic functions are more usually called membership functions, and the corresponding "sets" are called fuzzy sets. Fuzzy sets model the gradual change in the membership degree seen in many real-world predicates like "tall", "warm", etc.

Derivatives of the indicator function

A particular indicator function is the Heaviside step function

The distributional derivative of the Heaviside step function is equal to the Dirac delta function, i.e.

Thus the derivative of the Heaviside step function can be seen as the inward normal derivative at the boundary of the domain given by the positive half-line. In higher dimensions, the derivative naturally generalises to the inward normal derivative, while the Heaviside step function naturally generalises to the indicator function of some domain . Proceeding, it can be derived that the inward normal derivative of the indicator gives rise to a 'surface delta function', which can be indicated by :

where  is the outward normal of the surface . This 'surface delta function' has the following property:

By setting the function  equal to one, it follows that the inward normal derivative of the indicator integrates to the numerical value of the surface area .

See also

 Dirac measure
 Laplacian of the indicator
 Dirac delta
 Extension (predicate logic)
 Free variables and bound variables
 Heaviside step function
 Iverson bracket
 Kronecker delta, a function that can be viewed as an indicator for the identity relation
 Macaulay brackets
 Multiset
 Membership function
 Simple function
 Dummy variable (statistics)
 Statistical classification
 Zero-one loss function

Notes

References

Sources

 
 
 
 
 

 

Measure theory
Integral calculus
Real analysis
Mathematical logic
Basic concepts in set theory
Probability theory
Types of functions